The R827 road is a regional road in Dún Laoghaire–Rathdown, Dublin, Ireland connecting Blackrock and Monkstown with the N11 (Stillorgan Road).

The official definition of the R827 from the Roads Act 1993 (Classification of Regional Roads) Order 2012 states:

R827: Blackrock - Cornelscourt, County Dublin

Between its junction with R113 at Newtownpark Avenue and its junction with N11 at Cabinteely Bypass via Stradbrook Road, Deansgrange Road and Clonkeen Road all in the county of Dún Laoghaire–Rathdown.

See also
Roads in Ireland
National primary road
Regional road

References

Regional roads in the Republic of Ireland
Roads in County Dublin